The 2021 UC Davis football team represented the University of California, Davis as a member of the Big Sky Conference during the 2021 NCAA Division I FCS football season. The season Led by fifth-year head coach Dan Hawkins, the Aggies compiled an overall record of 8–4 with a mark of 5–3 in conference play, tying for third place in the Big Sky. UC Davis received an at-large bid to the NCAA Division I Football Championship playoff, where they lost to South Dakota State in the first round. The Aggies played home games at UC Davis Health Stadium in Davis, California.

Previous season

The Aggies finished the 2020–21 season 3–2 in a tie for third place.

Preseason

Polls
On July 26, 2021, during the virtual Big Sky Kickoff, the Aggies were predicted to finish sixth in the Big Sky by both the coaches and media.

Preseason All–Big Sky team
The Aggies had three players selected to the preseason all-Big Sky team.

Offense

Connor Pettek – C

Defense

Bryce Rodgers – DT

Special teams

Daniel Whelan – K

Schedule

Game summaries

at Tulsa

at San Diego

Dixie State

at No. 14 Weber State

Idaho

at Idaho State

Northern Colorado

at Cal Poly

at Northern Arizona

No. 7 Eastern Washington

No. 11 Sacramento State

Ranking movements

References

UC Davis
UC Davis Aggies football seasons
2021 NCAA Division I FCS playoff participants
UC Davis Aggies football